Red Bird Transit Center is a small bus-only station located on  Highway 67 and Hampton Rd. in Dallas, Texas (U.S.A.). It is owned and operated by Dallas Area Rapid Transit, whose buses mostly serve Dallas Executive Airport and Southwest Center Mall within this transit center.

External links
Dallas Area Rapid Transit - Red Bird Transit Center

Dallas Area Rapid Transit
Bus stations in Dallas